Zabina Khan (full name is Zabina Abdul Rashid Khan) is an Indian model, beauty queen, actress, assistant director also known as Zabyn Khan. She was crowned the first Miss Tourism Queen International in the year 2004.

Early life and career
Born in India in 1985 to a Muslim family.

At the age of 19, she competed in Gladrags Manhunt and Megamodel Contest in 2004 and was selected to compete in the first edition of Miss Tourism Queen International. She also competed in the first edition of Miss Tourism Queen International held in China in 2004 and was declared the eventual winner. She is the first ever winner in the pageant's history.

Zabina aka Zabyn Khan  is an actress and assistant director, known for Hulchul (2004),  Ek Hasina Ek Khiladi (2005), Bluffmaster (2005), Vettaiyaadu Vilaiyaadu (2006), Godava(2007), Jagadam (2007),  Panga na Lo (2007), Aashique banaya aapne (2007), Villu (2008),  Sanchalam (2011), Shivajinagar (2014).Assistant director for Action Jackson (2014), Solo (2017), Navrasa (2021)

She is currently working as Entertainment Director for Big Daddy casino and Strike Casino,  Goa known for her shows Our Stage your Talent (2019).

Big Bash (2018 - 2022), Freedom Fiesta (2018 - 2021)

References
4. https://m.imdb.com/name/nm1930298/?ref_=nv_sr_srsg_0

5. https://www.heraldgoa.in/Cafe/Big-Daddy-entertainment-to-hold-first-edition-of-%E2%80%98Our-Stage-Your-Talent%E2%80%99-for-Goans/150061

6.https://www.navhindtimes.in/2019/09/09/magazines/bnc/countdown-to-the-our-stage-your-talent-competition/

External links
 Miss Tourism Queen International Official Website

Indian beauty pageant winners
Female models from Mumbai
Living people
1985 births